Harry Niska is an American politician serving in the Minnesota House of Representatives since 2023. A member of the Republican Party of Minnesota, Niska represents District 31A in the north Twin Cities metropolitan area, which includes the cities of Ramsey and Andover in Anoka County, Minnesota.

Early life, education and career 
Niska grew up in Andover, Minnesota and graduated from Anoka High School. He received his bachelor's degree in political science from Concordia College, Moorhead.

Niska received his Juris Doctor  degree from the University of Minnesota, Law School. He worked as a law clerk on the 8th Circuit Court of Appeals for Judge Roger Leland Wollman from 2005 to 2006, and for Judge David Stras in 2018. Niska also served on the Ramsey County Charter Commission. Niska ran in the Republican primary for Attorney General of Minnesota in 2018, but withdrew prior to the primary.

Minnesota House of Representatives 
Niska was first elected to the Minnesota House of Representatives in 2022, after redistricting and the retirement of Republican incumbent Cal Bahr, who decided to run for a seat in the Minnesota Senate. Niska serves on the Commerce Finance and Policy and the Judiciary Finance and Civil Law Committees.

Conversion therapy bill 
Rep. Athena Hollins brought forth House File 16 in 2023, for banning conversion therapy for minors and vulnerable adults specifically. Similar legislation had been proposed several times in the five years before.

Rep. Niska opposed what he considered "free speech violations" contained within the bill. "What’s added in section three to the existing bill is a bunch of language calling out a particular viewpoint or particular content as fraudulent," Niska said.

He posed an amendment to remove the sections in the bill which categorize advertising for the procedure's efficacy as consumer fraud, and those that would ban "representing homosexuality as a mental disease, disorder, or illness, or guaranteeing to change an individual’s sexual orientation or gender identity." The amendment failed, but the bill passed the House.

Electoral history

Personal life 
Niska lives in Ramsey, Minnesota with his wife, Jen, and has three children.

References

External links 

Living people
21st-century American politicians
Republican Party members of the Minnesota House of Representatives
Concordia College (Moorhead, Minnesota) alumni
University of Minnesota Law School alumni
People from Anoka County, Minnesota